Udupi may refer to:

 Udupi city in Karnataka, India
 Udupi taluk in Karnataka, India
 Udupi district in Karnataka, India
 Udupi Chikmagalur (Lok Sabha constituency)
 Udupi cuisine, a cuisine of South India
 Udupi Krishna Temple

Notable people with the surname 
 Udupi Ramachandra Rao (1932–2017), Indian space scientist